Matthias Johann Eisen (28 September 1857 – 6 August 1934) was an Estonian folklorist and in 1920–1927 served as the Professor of Folk Poetry at University of Tartu.

Eisen is most known for his very thorough collection and a systematic typology of Estonian folk tales, totalling over 90,000 pages.

He was an honorary alumnus of the Estonian Students' Society.

References

External links
 Matthias Johann Eisen at Estonian Writers' Online Dictionary

1857 births
1934 deaths
Estonian folklorists
University of Tartu alumni